Krynology is the 2005 album by Austrian band Global Kryner.

This features the song that the band used to represent Austria in the Eurovision Song Contest 2005 (Y Asi) as well as a few well known popular songs covered in an Austrian style.  Such songs include songs by Britney Spears, The Black Eyed Peas, Robbie Williams and Falco.

Track listing
 Something Beautiful
 Hot Stuff
 I Can't Stand the Rain
 I'll be the One
 Rock Me Amadeus
 Stop
 Oops I Did it Again
 Y Asi
 First Day of my Life
 Shut Up
 Dreaming
 Eye of the Tiger
 Toxic
 My Foolish Heart
 Krynology

2005 albums